Stev Theloke (born 18 January 1978, in Karl-Marx-Stadt) is a professional swimmer from Germany, who won two bronze medals at the 2000 Summer Olympics. He did so in the 4×100 metres medley relay and in the 100 metres backstroke.

Theloke missed the 2004 Summer Olympics due to injury, and he was expelled from the German team for the 2005 World Aquatics Championships after he criticised his own swimming federation in an interview.

External links
 
 

1978 births
Living people
German male backstroke swimmers
Swimmers at the 1996 Summer Olympics
Swimmers at the 2000 Summer Olympics
Olympic swimmers of Germany
Sportspeople from Chemnitz
Olympic bronze medalists for Germany
Olympic bronze medalists in swimming
World Aquatics Championships medalists in swimming
European Aquatics Championships medalists in swimming
Medalists at the 2000 Summer Olympics
Goodwill Games medalists in swimming
Competitors at the 1998 Goodwill Games